Valentine Browne, 1st Earl of Kenmare (January 1754 – 3 October 1812) was the seventh Baronet Browne. He was created first Baron Castlerosse and first Viscount Kenmare on 12 February 1798, with the earlier peerages not being recognised. He was created first Earl of Kenmare on 3 January 1801.

He married Charlotte (1755–82), third daughter of Henry Dillon, 11th Viscount Dillon.

References

|-

1754 births
1812 deaths
Valentine
Kenmare, Valentine Browne, 5th Viscount
1